Walther Hermann Nernst  (25 June 1864 – 18 November 1941) was a German chemist known for his work in thermodynamics, physical chemistry, electrochemistry, and solid state physics. His formulation of the Nernst heat theorem helped pave the way for the third law of thermodynamics, for which he won the 1920 Nobel Prize in Chemistry. He is also known for developing the Nernst equation in 1887.

Life and career

Early years
Nernst was born in Briesen in West Prussia (now Wąbrzeźno, Poland) to Gustav Nernst (1827–1888) and Ottilie Nerger (1833–1876). His father was a country judge. Nernst had three older sisters and one younger brother. His third sister died of cholera. Nernst went to elementary school at Graudenz. He studied physics and mathematics at the universities of Zürich, Berlin, Graz and Würzburg, where he received his doctorate 1887. In 1889, he finished his habilitation at University of Leipzig.

Personal attributes
It was said that Nernst was mechanically minded in that he was always thinking of ways to apply new discoveries to industry. His hobbies included hunting and fishing. His friend Albert Einstein was amused by "his childlike vanity and self-complacency"  "His own study and laboratory always presented aspects of extreme chaos which his coworkers termed appropriately 'the state of maximum entropy'".

Family history
Nernst married Emma Lohmeyer in 1892 with whom he had two sons and three daughters. Both of Nernst's sons died fighting in World War I. With his colleagues at the University of Leipzig, Jacobus Henricus van’t Hoff and Svante Arrhenius, was establishing the foundations of a new theoretical and experimental field of inquiry within chemistry and suggested setting fire to unused coal seams to increase the global temperature. He was a vocal critic of Adolf Hitler and Nazism, and two of his three daughters married Jewish men. After Hitler came to power they emigrated, one to England and the other to Brazil.

Career

Nernst started university at Zurich in 1883, then after an interlude in Berlin, he returned to Zurich. He wrote his thesis at Graz where Boltzmann was professor, though he worked under the direction of Ettinghausen.  They discovered the Nernst effect: that a magnetic field applied perpendicular to a metallic conductor in a temperature gradient gives rise to an electrical potential difference.  Next, he moved to Würzburg under Kohlrausch where he submitted and defended his thesis. Ostwald recruited him to the first department of physical chemistry at Leipzig. Nernst moved there as an assistant, working on the thermodynamics of electrical currents in solutions.  Promoted to lecturer, he taught briefly at Heidelberg and then moved to Göttingen. Three years later, he was offered a professorship in Munich, to keep him in Prussia the government created a chair for him at Göttingen.  There, he wrote a celebrated textbook Theoretical Chemistry, which was translated into English, French, and Russian.  He also derived the Nernst equation for the electrical potential generated by unequal concentrations of an ion separated by a membrane that is permeable to the ion.  His equation is widely used in cell physiology and neurobiology.

The carbon electric filament lamp then in use was dim and expensive because it required a vacuum in its bulb. Nernst invented a solid-body radiator with a filament of rare-earth oxides, known as the Nernst glower, it is still important in the field of infrared spectroscopy. Continuous ohmic heating of the filament results in conduction. The glower operates best in wavelengths from 2 to 14 micrometers. It gives a bright light but only after a warm-up period.  Nernst sold the patent for one million marks, wisely not opting for royalties because soon the tungsten filament lamp filled with inert gas was introduced.  With his riches, Nernst in 1898 bought the first of the eighteen automobiles he owned during his lifetime and a country estate of more than five hundred hectares for hunting. He increased the power of his early automobiles by carrying a cylinder of nitrous oxide that he could inject into the carburetor. After eighteen productive years at Göttingen, investigating osmotic pressure and electrochemistry and presenting a theory of how nerves conduct, he moved to Berlin, and was awarded the title Geheimrat

In 1905, he proposed his "New Heat Theorem", later known as the Third law of thermodynamics. He showed that as the temperature approached absolute zero, the entropy approaches zero   while the free energy remains above zero. This is the work for which he is best remembered, as it enabled chemists to determine free energies (and therefore equilibrium points) of chemical reactions from heat measurements. Theodore Richards claimed that Nernst had stolen his idea, but Nernst is almost universally credited with the discovery. Nernst became friendly with Kaiser Wilhelm, whom he persuaded to found the Kaiser Wilhelm Gesellschaft for the Advancement of the Sciences with an initial capital of eleven million marks. Nernst's laboratory discovered that at low temperatures specific heats fell markedly and would probably disappear at absolute zero. This fall was predicted for liquids and solids in a 1909 paper of Albert Einstein's on the quantum mechanics of specific heats at cryogenic temperatures.  Nernst was so impressed that he traveled all the way to Zurich to visit Einstein, who was relatively unknown in Zurich in 1909, so people said: "Einstein must be a clever fellow if the great Nernst comes all the way from Berlin to Zurich to talk to him." Nernst and Planck lobbied to establish a special professorship in Berlin and Nernst donated to its endowment. In 1913 they traveled to Switzerland to persuade Einstein to accept it; a dream job: a named professorship at the top university in Germany, without teaching duties, leaving him free for research.

In 1911, Nernst and Max Planck organized the first Solvay Conference in Brussels.  In the following year, the impressionist painter Max Liebermann painted his portrait.

In 1914, the Nernsts were entertaining co-workers and students they had brought to their country estate in a private railway car when they learned that war had been declared. Their two older sons entered the army, while father enlisted in the voluntary driver's corps. He supported the German army against their opponent's charges of barbarism by signing the Manifesto of the Ninety-Three, On 21 August 1914, he drove documents from Berlin to the commander of the German right wing in France, advancing with them for two weeks until he could see the glow of the Paris lights at night.  The tide turned at the battle of the Marne.  When the stalemate in the trenches began, he returned home. He contacted Colonel Max Bauer, the staff officer responsible for munitions, with the idea of driving the defenders out of their trenches with shells releasing tear gas. When his idea was tried one of the observers was Fritz Haber, who argued that too many shells would be needed, it would be better to release a cloud of heavier-than-air poisonous gas; the first chlorine cloud attack on 22 April 1915 was not supported by a strong infantry thrust, so the chance that gas would break the stalemate was irrevocably gone. Nernst was awarded the Iron Cross second class.  As a Staff Scientific Advisor in the Imperial German Army, he directed research on explosives, much of which was done in his laboratory where they developed guanidine perchlorate.  Then he worked on the development of trench mortars.  He was awarded the Iron Cross first class and later the Pour le Mérite. When the high command was considering unleashing unrestricted submarine warfare, he asked the Kaiser for an opportunity to warn about the enormous potential of the United States as an adversary.  They would not listen, Ludendorff shouted him down for "incompetent nonsense." He published his book The Foundations of the New Heat Theorem.
Both sons had died at the front.

In 1918, after studying photochemistry, he proposed the atomic chain reaction theory. It stated that when a reaction in which free atoms are formed that can decompose target molecules into more free atoms would result in a chain reaction. His theory is closely related to the natural process of Nuclear Fission.

In 1920, he and his family briefly fled abroad because he was one of the scientists on the Allied list of war criminals. Later that year he received the Nobel Prize in chemistry in recognition of his work on thermochemistry. He was elected Rector of Berlin University for 1921–1922.  He set up an agency to channel government and private funds to young scientists and declined becoming Ambassador to the United States. For two unhappy years, he was the president of the Physikalisch-Technische Reichsanstalt (National Physical Laboratory), where he could not cope with the "mixture of mediocrity and red tape". In 1924, he became director of the Institute of Physical Chemistry at Berlin.

In 1927, the decrease in specific heat at low temperatures was extended to gases. He studied the theories of cosmic rays and cosmology.

Although a press release described him as "completely unmusical", Nernst developed an electric piano, the "Neo-Bechstein-Flügel" in 1930 in association with the Bechstein and Siemens companies, replacing the sounding board with vacuum tube amplifiers. The piano used electromagnetic pickups to produce electronically modified and amplified sound in the same way as an electric guitar. In fact, he was a pianist, sometimes accompanying Einstein's violin.

In 1933, Nernst learned that a colleague, with whom he had hoped to collaborate, had been dismissed from the department because he was a Jew.  Nernst immediately taxied to see Haber to request a position in his Institute, which was not controlled by the government, only to learn that Haber was moving to England. Soon, Nernst was in trouble for declining to fill out a government form on his racial origins. He retired from his professorship but was sacked from the board of the Kaiser Wilhelm Institute.  He lived quietly in the country; in 1937 he traveled to Oxford to receive an honorary degree, also visiting his eldest daughter, her husband, and his three grandchildren. Nernst had a severe heart attack in 1939. He died in 1941 at Gau, Lower Silesia, East Prussia (now Niwica, Poland) and was buried three times. He was buried for the first time near the place of his death. However, his remains were moved to Berlin, where he was buried a second time. Finally they were moved again and buried near Max Planck, Otto Hahn and Max von Laue in Göttingen, Germany.

Honours
In 1923, botanist Ignatz Urban published Nernstia, which is a genus of flowering plants from Mexico, in the family Rubiaceae and named in his honour.

Publications
 Walther Nernst, "Reasoning of theoretical chemistry: Nine papers (1889–1921)" (Ger., Begründung der Theoretischen Chemie : Neun Abhandlungen, 1889–1921). Frankfurt am Main : Verlag Harri Deutsch, c. 2003. 
 Walther Nernst, "The theoretical and experimental bases of the New Heat Theorem" (Ger., Die theoretischen und experimentellen Grundlagen des neuen Wärmesatzes).  Halle [Ger.] W. Knapp, 1918 [tr. 1926]. [ed., this is a list of thermodynamical papers from the physico-chemical institute of the University of Berlin (1906–1916); Translation available by Guy Barr 
 Walther Nernst, "Theoretical chemistry from the standpoint of Avogadro's law and thermodynamics" (Ger., Theoretische Chemie vom Standpunkte der Avogadroschen Regel und der Thermodynamik). Stuttgart, F. Enke, 1893 [5th edition, 1923].

See also
German inventors and discoverers
C. Bechstein Pianofortefabrik
Chain reaction
Cosmological constant problem
Cosmic background radiation
History of electrophoresis
Nernst–Einstein equation
Nernst–Lewis–Latimer convention
Solid state ionics
Stochastic electrodynamics
Threshold potential
Tired light
Zero-point energy

References

Cited sources
Stone, A. Douglas (2013) Einstein and the Quantum. Princeton University Press.

Further reading

External links

 
  – Review of Diana Barkan's Walther Nernst and the Transition to Modern Physical Science
 "Hermann Walther Nernst, Nobel Prize in Chemistry 1920 : Prize Presentation". Presentation Speech by Professor Gerard De Geer, President of the Royal Swedish Academy of Sciences.
 Schmitt, Ulrich, "Walther Nernst". Physicochemical institute, Göttingen
 
 
 
 
  including the Nobel Lecture, 12 December 1921 Studies in Chemical Thermodynamics

 
German Nobel laureates
People associated with the University of Zurich
Nobel laureates in Chemistry
People from the Province of Prussia
People from Wąbrzeźno
German physical chemists
19th-century German chemists
Thermodynamicists
Inventors of musical instruments
Academic staff of the University of Göttingen
1864 births
1941 deaths
Humboldt University of Berlin alumni
University of Graz alumni
Foreign Members of the Royal Society
Recipients of the Pour le Mérite (civil class)
University of Würzburg alumni
Rare earth scientists
German people of World War I
Recipients of the Iron Cross (1914), 1st class
20th-century German chemists